Smiling Pets is a multi-artist tribute album consisting of experimental/alternative cover versions of Beach Boys songs from Pet Sounds (1966) and the never-finished  Smile project. It was released exclusively in Japan by Sony Records in March 1998.

Background
Some song titles differ from how they have been officially published by the Beach Boys. The most prominent of which is "Tones", which is a cover version of the instrumental Smile track "Holidays". Prior to Smiling Pets, most Smile material was only sparsely available on the compilation Good Vibrations: Thirty Years of The Beach Boys (1993). Because "Holidays" had not been officially released until more than a decade later on The Smile Sessions (2011), it is highly likely that unauthorized bootlegs with erroneous track lists were consulted by Smiling Pets artists. "Tones" (also known as "Tune X") was actually a working title for an entirely different composition recorded by Carl Wilson during Smile sessions. Another misleading title is "Heroes and Villains", which can arguably be more accurately described as a reprise of "Do You Like Worms?".

Tracks from this album later reappeared on individual band compilations or album reissues. "Surfin' U.S.A." is present in complete form on Melt-Banana's MxBx 1998/13,000 Miles at Light Velocity (1999). Secret Chiefs 3's cover versions of "Good Vibrations" and "Heroes and Villains" are on their compilation Path of Most Resistance (2007). The Olivia Tremor Control's versions of "Do You Like Worms?" and "Little Pad" were later included as bonus tracks on reissued releases of Music from the Unrealized Film Script: Dusk at Cubist Castle (1996).

An album similarly-fashioned to Smiling Pets was released two years earlier, entitled The Christmas Album, which was a tribute to the compilation A Christmas Gift for You from Phil Spector (1963). It was also compiled by Seiji Morita and included some of the same performers.

The Ships and FORMS are aliases of the Olivia Tremor Control and Secret Chiefs 3, respectively. OnoTetsu is the pianist for Harpy, an experimental Japanese noise band. Short Hair Front and Feelds were short-lived bands seemingly led by the album compiler Seiji Morita, and he is credited as arranger for their contributions "I'm Waiting for the Day" and "I Just Wasn't Made for These Times". Little is known about the album's more unrecognizable artists Sports Guitar or R. Gree & Grey Tea. They may also be pseudonyms.

Critical reception
Writing in his 2005 book about Smile, Domenic Priore praised Smiling Pets and highlighted "Fall Breaks and Back to Winter" and "Cool, Cool Water" as stand-out tracks.

Track listing

Personnel 
Production staff
Seiji Morita – compilation producer
Masami Hatta – executive producer
Mitsuo Koike – mastering
Hideki Ohtsuka – photography
Youko Kobayashi – artwork

See also
List of cover versions of Beach Boys songs

References

External links
 

The Beach Boys tribute albums
1998 albums
1998 compilation albums
Alternative rock compilation albums
Compilation albums by Japanese artists
 Compilation